Lyckantropen (2002) is a Swedish short film written and directed by Steve Ericsson. It follows a family in a small town that struggles with relationship balance and internal emotional conflicts. The film is only 28 minutes long and features minimal dialogue throughout.

The soundtrack, Lyckantropen Themes, was composed by Norwegian avant-garde electronica / black metal band Ulver.

External links

Swedish short films
2002 films
2002 short films
2000s Swedish films